1961 in sports describes the year's events in world sport.

American football
 NFL Championship: the Green Bay Packers won 37–0 over the New York Giants at Lambeau Field
 Rose Bowl (1960 season):
 The Minnesota Golden Gophers lose 17–7 to the Washington Huskies; still voted national champions
 The Ohio State Buckeyes boycott a trip to the Rose Bowl the following January resulting in student protests on campus.
 AFL Championship – Houston Oilers won 10–3 over the San Diego Chargers

Association football

England
 FA Cup final – Tottenham Hotspur 2-0 Leicester City. Tottenham also were division 1 champions, making them the first British club to win the double.

Australian rules football
 Victorian Football League
 August 12: Richmond becomes the only team to fail to kick a goal in a match since 1921, scoring only 0.8 (8) to St. Kilda's 12.19 (91).
 September 23: Hawthorn wins the 65th VFL pennant and its first, beating Footscray 13.16 (94) to 7.9 (51)
 John James wins the 34th Brownlow Medal

Bandy

Baseball
 The American League expands to 10 teams, adding the Los Angeles Angels and the new Washington Senators. The league schedule is expanded from 154 to 162 games.
 January 16 – Mickey Mantle becomes the highest paid player in Major League Baseball by signing a contract that will pay him $75,000 per season.
 April 11 – The former Washington Senators play their first home game in Metropolitan Stadium as the Minnesota Twins
 July 13 – In his majors debut, Milwaukee Braves outfielder Mack Jones tied a post-1900 National League record by collecting three singles and a double in his first game.
 Roger Maris hits 61 home runs during the regular season, establishing a record for the longer season.  Babe Ruth's record of 60 still stood for the shorter season.
 October – World Series – New York Yankees win 4 games to 1 over the Cincinnati Reds. The series MVP is Whitey Ford of the Yankees.

Basketball
 NCAA Men's Basketball Championship –
 Cincinnati wins 70–65 over Ohio St.
 NBA Finals –
 Boston Celtics won 4 games to 1 over the St. Louis Hawks
 The twelfth European basketball championship, Eurobasket 1961, is won by Soviet Union.

Boxing
 June 3 in Los Angeles – Emile Griffith knocked out Gaspar Ortega in the 12th round to retain the Welterweight Championship

Canadian football
 Grey Cup – Winnipeg Blue Bombers win 21–14 over the Hamilton Tiger-Cats

Cycling
 August 1 – death of Adrie Voorting (aged 30), Dutch road bicycle and track cyclist
 Giro d'Italia won by Ercole Baldini of Italy
 Tour de France – Jacques Anquetil of France
 UCI Road World Championships – Men's road race – Rik Van Looy of Belgium

Figure skating
 The World Figure Skating Championships in Prague are cancelled after the entire USA team of skaters, officials, leaders and chaperones are killed in a plane crash on 15 February en route to the competition.
 Among the dead are:
Bradley Lord (21), USA men's figure skating champion;
Maribel Vinson-Owen, USA women's figure skating champion and coach;
Maribel Yerxa Owen (20), USA women's figure skating champion;
Laurence Owen (16), USA women's figure skating champion.

Golf
Men's professional
 Masters Tournament – Gary Player becomes the first international golfer to win the Masters.
 U.S. Open – Gene Littler
 The Open – Arnold Palmer
 PGA Championship – Jerry Barber
 PGA Tour money leader – Gary Player – $64,540
 Ryder Cup – United States wins 14½ to 9½ over Britain in team golf.
Men's amateur
 British Amateur – Michael Bonallack
 U.S. Amateur – Jack Nicklaus
Women's professional
 Women's Western Open – Mary Lena Faulk
 LPGA Championship – Mickey Wright
 U.S. Women's Open – Mickey Wright
 Titleholders Championship – Mickey Wright
 LPGA Tour money leader – Mickey Wright – $22,236

Harness racing
 United States Pacing Triple Crown races –
 Cane Pace – Cold Front
 Little Brown Jug – Henry T. Adios
 Messenger Stakes – Adios Don
 United States Trotting Triple Crown races –
 Hambletonian – Harlan Dean
 Yonkers Trot – Duke Rodney
 Kentucky Futurity – Duke Rodney
 Australian Inter Dominion Harness Racing Championship –
 Pacers: Massacre

Horse racing
Steeplechases
 Cheltenham Gold Cup – Saffron Tartan
 Grand National – Nicolaus Silver
Flat races
 Australia – Melbourne Cup won by Lord Fury
 Canada – Queen's Plate won by Blue Light
 France – Prix de l'Arc de Triomphe won by Molvedo
 Ireland – Irish Derby Stakes won by Your Highness
 English Triple Crown Races:
 2,000 Guineas Stakes – Rockavon
 The Derby – Psidium
 St. Leger Stakes – Aurelius
 United States Triple Crown Races:
 Kentucky Derby – Carry Back
 Preakness Stakes – Carry Back
 Belmont Stakes – Sherluck

Ice hockey
 Art Ross Trophy as the NHL's leading scorer during the regular season: Bernie "Boom-Boom" Geoffrion, Montreal Canadiens
 Hart Memorial Trophy for the NHL's Most Valuable Player: Bernie "Boom-Boom" Geoffrion, Montreal Canadiens
 Stanley Cup – Chicago Black Hawks win 4 games to 2 over the Detroit Red Wings
 World Hockey Championship –
 Men's champion: Trail Smoke Eaters from Canada
 NCAA Men's Ice Hockey Championship – University of Denver Pioneers defeat St. Lawrence University Saints 12–2 in Denver, Colorado

Motorsport

Radiosport
 First European Amateur Radio Direction Finding Championships held in Stockholm, Sweden.  This event was the first organized international competition in the sport.

Rugby league
1961 New Zealand rugby league season
1960–61 Northern Rugby Football League season / 1961–62 Northern Rugby Football League season
1961 NSWRFL season

Rugby union
 67th Five Nations Championship series is won by France

Swimming
 August 13 – USA's Becky Collins breaks the world record in the women's 200m butterfly (long course) during a meet in Philadelphia – 2:32.8.
 August 19 – US swimmer Carl Robie takes over the world record in the men's 200m butterfly (long course) from his compatriot Michael Troy at a meet in Los Angeles, clocking 2:12.6.

Tennis
Australia
 Australian Men's Singles Championship – Roy Emerson (Australia) defeats Rod Laver (Australia) 1–6, 6–3, 7–5, 6–4
 Australian Women's Singles Championship – Margaret Smith Court (Australia) defeats Jan Lehane O'Neill (Australia) 6–1, 6–4
England
 Wimbledon Men's Singles Championship – Rod Laver (Australia) defeats Chuck McKinley (USA) 6–3, 6–1, 6–4
 Wimbledon Women's Singles Championship – Angela Mortimer Barrett (Great Britain) defeats Christine Truman Janes (Great Britain) 4–6, 6–4, 7–5
France
 French Men's Singles Championship – Manuel Santana (Spain) defeats Nicola Pietrangeli (Italy) 4–6, 6–1, 3–6, 6–0, 6–2
 French Women's Singles Championship – Ann Haydon (Great Britain) defeats Yola Ramírez (Mexico) 6–2, 6–1
USA
 American Men's Singles Championship – Roy Emerson (Australia) defeats Rod Laver (Australia) 7–5, 6–3, 6–2
 American Women's Singles Championship – Darlene Hard (USA) defeats Ann Haydon (Great Britain) 6–3, 6–4
Davis Cup
 1961 Davis Cup –  5–0  at Kooyong Stadium (grass) Melbourne, Australia

Multi-sport events
 Pan Arab Games held in Casablanca, Morocco
 Second Summer Universiade held in Sofia, Bulgaria

Awards
 Associated Press Male Athlete of the Year – Roger Maris, Major League Baseball
 Associated Press Female Athlete of the Year – Wilma Rudolph, Track and field

References

 
Sports by year